The Sandhawk was a sounding rocket developed by Sandia National Laboratories in 1966. This single-stage, sub-orbital rocket had a mass of 700 kg (1,540 lb), a takeoff thrust of 80 kN (18,000 lbf), and could reach heights around 200 km or so. Sandia launched eight of these rockets between 1966 and 1974 as part of experiments conducted for the United States Atomic Energy Commission. About 25% of the launches failed.

References 
Source: https://web.archive.org/web/20150824111209/http://www.astronautix.com/lvs/sandhawk.htm

Sounding rockets of the United States
Sandia National Laboratories